The 1927 Princeton Tigers football team represented Princeton University in the 1927 college football season. The team finished with a 6–1 record under 14th-year head coach Bill Roper.  The Tigers outscored opponents by a combined total of 151 to 31, and their sole loss was in the final game of the season by a 14–6 score against Yale. No Princeton were selected as first-team honorees on the 1927 College Football All-America Team.

Schedule

References

Princeton
Princeton Tigers football seasons
Princeton Tigers footballl